Belmonte is a municipality located in the province of Cuenca, Castile-La Mancha, Spain. In 2009, it had a population of 2.251.

Notable people
 Juan Pacheco, born in Belmonte in 1419, he was the first Marquess of Villena.
 Pedro Girón, born in Belmonte in 1423, he was Grand Master of the Order of Calatrava.
 Fray Luis de León, born in Belmonte between 1527 and 1528.

References

Municipalities in the Province of Cuenca